The 1975 World Snooker Championship was a professional snooker tournament that took place between 9 April and 1 May 1975 across Australia. The event was the 1975 edition of the World Snooker Championship, first held in 1927. The tournament featured 27 participants, 8 of which were seeded and received byes to the second round. The event featured a prize fund of A$30,000 with the winner receiving A$7,500. This was the second (and to date last) World Snooker Championship to be held outside of the United Kingdom.

The final was held at the Nunawading Basketball Centre on Burwood Highway, in Burwood East, Victoria. Ray Reardon played Eddie Charlton in a best-of-61  match. Reardon won 10 of the 12 frames on the second day to lead 16–8 but Eddie Charlton won the first nine frames on day three to lead. Reardon then led 23–21 before Charlton won eight frames in a row to lead 29–23 requiring just two of the last nine frames to win. However Reardon then won 7 frames in a row to lead again and, although Charlton levelled the match at 30–30, Reardon won the deciding frame  to win 31–30.

Overview

The World Snooker Championship is a professional tournament and the official world championship of the game of snooker. Founded in the late 19th century by British Army soldiers stationed in India, the sport was popular in the British Isles. However, in the modern era it has become increasingly popular worldwide, especially in East and Southeast Asian nations such as China, Hong Kong and Thailand.

Joe Davis won the first World Championship in 1927, the final match being held in Camkin's Hall, Birmingham, England. Ray Reardon was the defending champion in 1975, having defeated Graham Miles 22-12 in the 1974 final.

Format 
The championship was held from 9 April to 1 May 1975 at multiple locations across Australia. This was the second time since 1969 that the championship was held outside the United Kingdom, after 1971. Tobacco brand Park Drive did not continue their sponsorship from 1974. The WPBSA appointed Eddie Charlton Promotions as the promoter. The event featured 27 participants, with a preliminary round, and eight seeded players who were awarded byes to the second round. The number of frames increased during the tournament, with the opening rounds being the best of 29, the quarter-finals and semi-finals best of 37 and the final a best of 61 frames match.

There was controversy about the seedings. John Spencer was seeded 8 which meant that he met top seed Ray Reardon in the quarter-final; the pair were regarded as the two leading players. 1972 champion Alex Higgins was also in the top half of the draw, while promoter Eddie Charlton was in the bottom half.

Schedule

Prize fund 
The breakdown of prize money for this year is shown below:

Winner: A$7,500
Runner-up: A$4,000
Semi-final: A$3.000
Quarter-final: A$1,500
Last 16: A$750
Total: A$30,000

Tournament summary 
Most of the early round matches were played in New South Wales although the semi-finals were played in Canberra and Brisbane with the final in Melbourne. South African Professional Championship winner Perrie Mans was defeated in the opening round, by Dennis Taylor 15-12. Mans was down by two frames after the first session, but recovered to 7-7, before Taylor pulled ahead in the third session.

Reardon and Higgins were level at 10-10; Reardon went on to win 19-14.

The final was held at the Nunawading Basketball Centre on Burwood Highway, in Burwood East, Victoria, as the best of 61 frames. Reardon led 16-8, but Charlton then won the next nine frames to take the lead. Reardon was ahead 22-20, but Charlton won eight of the following frames lead 28-23. Reardon produced a seven-frame winning streak to leave himself needing one further frame at 30-29. Charlton won the 60th frame. In the deciding frame, Reardon made a 62 break, to claim victory at 31–30. It was Reardon's third consecutive championship win, and his fourth overall. In all, he won six world titles.

The tournament received significantly less UK press coverage than the three preceding world championships had; the level of coverage in the Australian press was described as "very poor" by Snooker Scene.

Results

Preliminary matches
Results of the preliminary matches were as follows.

Main draw 
Below is the results from the event. Players in bold denote match winners, whilst numbers in brackets are the players seeding.

Notes

References

1975
World Snooker Championship
World Snooker Championship
Sports competitions in Melbourne
1970s in Melbourne
World Snooker Championship
World Snooker Championship